KELK (1240 AM) is a radio station broadcasting an adult contemporary format. Licensed to Elko, Nevada, United States, the station is currently owned by Elko Broadcasting Company and features programming from ABC Radio. The station is also heard on 95.9 FM, through a translator licensed to Carlin, Nevada.

KELK was originally on 1340 kHz. It moved to 1240 kHz in 1951.

Translator

References

External links
Official Website

FCC History Cards for KELK

ELK
Mainstream adult contemporary radio stations in the United States
Elko, Nevada